Jim Donelon is an American politician. He is the Louisiana Insurance Commissioner, a role he has served in since 2006. He previously served as member of the Louisiana House of Representatives from 1981 to 2001.

Early life and education
Donelon grew up New Orleans and attended Jesuit High School. He received his bachelor's degree from the University of New Orleans and his Juris Doctor from the Loyola University New Orleans College of Law.

Political career
Donelon began his career in public office serving on the Jefferson Parish Council from 1978 to 1980. From 1982 to 2001, he served as a Republican member of the Louisiana House of Representatives. As a state lawmaker, he chaired the House Committee on Insurance and co-chaired the Republican Legislative Delegation.

He ran for Lieutenant Governor of Louisiana in 1979 and for United States Senate in 1998, but he lost both races.

In 2001, he was appointed deputy commissioner of the Louisiana Department of Insurance by then-Insurance Commissioner J. Robert Wooley. In February 2006, Wooley resigned to take a legal position with the firm Adams and Reese in Baton Rouge, and Donelon succeeded him to the position of Insurance Commissioner. Donelon subsequently won the office in a special election held in the fall of 2006 by defeating Republican State Senator James David Cain of Beauregard Parish.

Personal life
Donelon and his wife, Merilynn, have four daughters.

References

|-

1944 births
Jesuit High School (New Orleans) alumni
Lawyers from New Orleans
Living people
Louisiana Democrats
Louisiana insurance commissioners
Louisiana Republicans
Loyola University New Orleans College of Law alumni
Members of the Louisiana House of Representatives
People from Metairie, Louisiana
Politicians from New Orleans
United States Army officers
University of New Orleans alumni